Beela is a locality immediately east of Brunswick Junction in the South West of Western Australia. The name Beela means "there in that place is where the river water is running into a pool" in the local Noongar language.

Aside from agricultural land, Beela also contains a Water Corporation dam originally built in the 1930s.

References 

Towns in Western Australia
Shire of Harvey